Valluvar Kottam is a monument in Chennai, dedicated to the classical Tamil poet philosopher Valluvar. It is the city’s biggest Tamil cultural centre.

Location
Valluvar Kottam is located at the intersection of the Kodambakkam High road and the Village road in Nungambakkam neighbourhood of Chennai. The monument now stands at what was once the deepest point of a local lake called the Nungambakkam lake.

History
The construction of the Valluvar Kottam was conceived and executed by the then Chief Minister of Tamil Nadu M. Karunanidhi during the 1970s. It was designed by South Indian traditional architect V. Ganapati Sthapati, who is also the architect of the Thiruvalluvar Statue at Kanyakumari. It was inaugurated in April 1976 by the then President of India Fakhruddin Ali Ahmed.

The monument
The monument consists of a decorative arch, an auditorium that can accommodate around 3,500 people, and the Kural Manimandapa, where all the 1,330 couplets from all 133 chapters of the Kural literature are inscribed on bas-relief. The hallmark of the monument is the 39-meter-high (128 feet) stone car, a replica of the famed temple chariot of Thiruvarur. The chariot is made of around 3000 blocks of granite stone from Tiruvannamalai and weighs 2,700 tonnes. The largest of these stones weigh as much as 40 tonnes. The four giant-sized wheels of the chariot measure 11 feet in diameter and 2 feet in thickness. A life-size statue of Valluvar has been installed in the chariot. The chariot is adorned with the famed Kalamkari drawings. The bottom portion of the chariot features bas relief sculptures depicting all the 133 chapters of the Kural text. The central auditorium measures 220 feet by 100 feet and is said to be Asia’s largest at the time of its construction. The roof of the monument has a terraced garden with two large pools.

Visitors
The monument is visited by an average of about 700 people during weekdays and 1000 people during weekends.

Renovation
The monument is maintained by the memorial section of the information and public relations department of the state government. It was renovated in 2007 at a cost of  6 million. In 2018, the department started renovating the memorial at a cost of  8.5 million.

See also 
 Thiruvalluvar Temple, Mylapore
 Architecture of Chennai
 Heritage structures in Chennai

References

External links
 Official site of the Chennai District, maintained by the Tamil Nadu government

Tirukkural
Memorials to Valluvar
Monuments and memorials in Chennai